The XVII World Rhythmic Gymnastics Championships were held in Alicante, Spain, on November 4–07 1993.

Individual All-Around

Individual Rope

Individual Ball

Individual Hoop

Individual Ribbon

Individual Clubs

Team All-Around

References
 

Rhythmic Gymnastics World Championships
Rhythmic Gymnastics Championships
Gym
World Rhythmic Gymnastics Championships